The 1907 Colorado Silver and Gold football team was an American football team that represented the University of Colorado as a member of the Colorado Football Association (CGA) during the 1907 college football season. Led by Frank Castleman in his second and final season as head coach, Colorado compiled an overall record of 5–3 with a mark of 2–2 in conference play, placing third in the CFA.

Schedule

References

Colorado
Colorado Buffaloes football seasons
Colorado Silver and Gold football